Madaoua (var. Madoua, Madawa) is a town located in the Tahoua Region of Niger. It has a population of 22,175 (2001 census). It is seat of the Madaoua Department, forming the southwest corner of the Region, and is an Urban Commune.

References

 Finn Fuglestad. A History of Niger: 1850–1960. Cambridge University Press (1983) 
 Jolijn Geels. Niger. Bradt UK/ Globe Pequot Press USA (2006) 
 Samuel Decalo. Historical Dictionary of Niger (3rd ed.). Scarecrow Press, Boston & Folkestone, (1997) 

Communes of Niger